Reggae is a style of Jamaican music that evolved in the late 1960s. Later, it became a major part of the music of Nigeria, especially after the rise of singer Majek Fashek.  Fashek was, like many Nigerian reggae performers, a part of the long-running band ‘The Jahsticks’.  The most notable is Daniel Wilson (AKA Mr. Ragamuffin) who introduced his brand of ragamuffin music to Nigeria. Daniel Wilson dazzled the Nigerian music scene with hits like Mr.Ragamuffin and Original Bad Boy.  Other musicians include Jerri Jheto, Daddy Showkey, Ras Kimono, Rymzo, De king, high school band of Victor Eshiet and Peggy Umanna, The Mandators, and the London-based MC Afrikan Simba.  These pioneers of Reggae music include big names like Orits Williki, Peterside Ottong, Andy Shoreman, Alex Zitto, Evelyn Ogoli, Wale Man, Isaac Black, and others.  These pioneers paved the way for the new generation of home-grown reggae artists.

Reggae music was propelled into the mainstream Nigerians in the mid-eighties.  During this period, FM Radio stations became a viable medium of choice for many recording artists and record label executives, because of its chart-topping musical programs delivered to the listeners with hard dose of fresh, and youthful Radio personality broadcasters mentioned below.  They re-invented the way musical programmes ought to be presented on FM Radio to the listeners around the country.  In both print and electronic media, they saw an avenue to promote a different kind of music in the ever-diverse Nigerian demography.  In 1980s came the advent of FM Radio stations including Radio Nigeria 1 Ikoyi-Lagos, Radio Nigeria 2 Lagos on Martin Street, and the newly minted sister's station Radio Nigeria 3 Ikoyi-Lagos, in 1987.  They began and frequently hit the airwaves with this new type of music genre that took Nigerians by storm.  Radio Personality and broadcasters.

As the years have progressed, so too has the face of Reggae music in Nigeria.  Fusing many styles with Reggae beats, a new generation of Nigerian Reggae artists have emerged.  Blending styles that borrow influences from Reggae, Hip hop, R&B, and dance-hall traditions; artists such as Banton, Winning Jah and Benny Paladin expand the definition of Nigerian born Reggae artists, maintaining the trends of Reggae music as seen throughout the world.

References

Reggae by country
Reggae